USV Private Limited (formerly USV Limited) is an Indian multinational pharmaceutical and biotechnology company in Mumbai. The company operates across 75 countries globally, and is a leading producer of Metformin in India.

The company was founded by Vithal Balkrishna Gandhi to provide affordable and quality healthcare to every Indian. Leena Tewari, his granddaughter, is the chairperson of the company, and Prashant Tewari is the managing director. 

The company is focused on the development of small-molecule active pharmaceutical ingredients along with custom research services for drug development.

USV is also the producer and retailer of Sebamed products in India. It is also the marketer of some of Fujix Corp's products in all global markets outside Japan and United States.

References

Pharmaceutical companies of India
Biotechnology companies of India
Pharmaceutical companies established in 1961
Companies based in Mumbai
Indian companies established in 1961
1961 establishments in Maharashtra